Lance Taylor (born ) is an American football coach and former player who is currently the head coach for the Western Michigan Broncos football team.

Playing career
Taylor was a walk-on wide receiver for Alabama from 1999 to 2002, where he played under four different head coaches - Mike DuBose, Dennis Franchione, Mike Price, and Mike Shula.  He eventually would play in 38 consecutive games as a wide receiver and earn a scholarship. As a senior, Taylor was a special-teams captain.

Taylor played professional football for the Colorado Crush and Columbus Destroyers of the Arena Football League, and the Green Bay Blizzard and the Louisville Fire of the AF2.  An ACL injury ultimately ended his playing career.  The reconstructive procedure was performed by Dr. James Andrews.

Coaching career

Stanford
Taylor served as the running backs coach for Stanford from 2014 through 2016. During his tenure he coached Heisman Trophy runner-up Christian McCaffrey and All-Pac-12 running back Bryce Love. His team won the 2016 Rose Bowl and the 2015 Pac-12 Football Championship. During the 2015 season, Taylor was named the Running Backs Coach of the Year by FootballScoop.com.

Notre Dame
Following two years in the National Football League (NFL) with the Carolina Panthers, Taylor was named running backs coach for Notre Dame in 2019. The team made the College Football Playoff in 2020 and also made an appearance in the 2020 ACC Championship Game. Following the 2020 season, he was promoted to run game coordinator.

Louisville
Despite rumors that Taylor would be retained by Notre Dame following the departure of Brian Kelly, it was announced that Taylor would be leaving the Fighting Irish to become Louisville's next offensive coordinator under coach Scott Satterfield.

Western Michigan
On December 8, 2022, Taylor was hired as the 17th head football coach at Western Michigan.

Personal life
Taylor is from Mount Vernon, Alabama, where he graduated from Citronelle High School as class salutatorian. He graduated with a bachelor's degree in business management in 2003 from the University of Alabama. He is married to his wife Jamie and has two children, Jet his son, and daughter Jemma.

Taylor's father, James, played for Bear Bryant at Alabama, where he was a member of three SEC and one National Championship teams.  In 2015, he was named to the Mobile Sports Hall of Fame.

Taylor is a member of the MOWA Band of Choctaw Indians, a state-recognized Native American tribe in Alabama. As of December 2022, he is the only NCAA Division I head football coach who is Native American.

Head coaching record

References

External links
 Louisville profile

1981 births
Living people
American football wide receivers
Alabama Crimson Tide football coaches
Alabama Crimson Tide football players
Carolina Panthers coaches
Louisville Cardinals football coaches
New York Jets coaches
Notre Dame Fighting Irish football coaches
Stanford Cardinal football coaches
Western Michigan Broncos football coaches
People from Mobile County, Alabama
Coaches of American football from Alabama
Players of American football from Alabama